Midnight Lightning is a  grade  bouldering problem on the granite Columbia Boulder in Camp 4 of Yosemite National Park. It is considered to be one of the world's most famous bouldering problems. Ron Kauk did the first ascent in 1978.

History

The problem was identified by a chalk lightning bolt drawn by John Bachar after making the second ascent in 1978.  Bacher wrote: "It was Yabo [John Yablonski] who actually 'found' Midnight Lightning. He was sitting in front of it one day and came over to me and Ron Kauk and said he found a new boulder problem. He said it would go. We laughed and said it was impossible. We thought there was about as much chance of doing it as there was the chance that a lightning bolt could strike at midnight (like in the Hendrix song Midnight Lightning), so I drew a bolt on it in chalk. That's it—pretty stupid, huh?" 

Kauk recounted about working on the problem with John Bachar and John Yablonski: "After 4 months of off and on effort, I was the first one to pull over the lip and complete the climb, which to this day has had an effect on my personal sense of place and history, within the climbing community, throughout the world". The first female ascent was by Lynn Hill in 1998, although it was not the first-ever female  (which was by climber  in 1989 on Le Carnage). The second female ascent was by Lisa Rands in 2001. 

In May 2013, the lightning bolt was scrubbed off the boulder, by climber and Climbing magazine contributor James Lucas, who claimed the image had lost its magic, and was now more of a trademark or tourist attraction.  The bolt was re-drawn in the same location a few days later.  Since then, there have been other incidents, but Kauk and others have repaired and maintained the bolt image regularly.

In 2021, when the American Alpine Club awarded the Underhill Lifetime Achievement award to Kauk, their citation read: "Perhaps Ron's most iconic climbing achievements is a boulder problem right in the middle of Camp 4 known as Midnight Lightning".

Route

The climber must suspend themself by the fingertips of their left hand, swing around a ledge of rock, and propel themself far enough up, about four feet, to grab a precarious fingertip hold with their right hand. To do that they have to create momentum from stillness."

Filmography
 Documentary with Ron Kauk, David Sjöquist and Caro North on Midnight Lightning:

Bibliography
Yosemite Bouldering (Shannon Joslin, James Lucas, Kimbrough Moore), 2020, Sentinel Press. .

See also
History of rock climbing
List of first ascents (sport climbing)
The Mandala, famous  boulder in The Buttermilks, California
The Wheel of Life, famous  boulder in the Grampians, Australia

References

External links
Adam Ondra: Climbing the Americas (Part 1) Midnight Lightning Climbing magazine, (2018)

Climbing routes
Yosemite National Park